The 2022 Aspria Tennis Cup was a professional tennis tournament played on clay courts. It was the sixteenth edition of the tournament which was part of the 2022 ATP Challenger Tour. It took place in Milan, Italy between 20 and 26 June 2022.

Singles main-draw entrants

Seeds

 1 Rankings are as of 13 June 2022.

Other entrants
The following players received wildcards into the singles main draw:
  Gianmarco Ferrari
  Matteo Gigante
  Francesco Maestrelli

The following players received entry into the singles main draw as alternates:
  Joris De Loore
  Ernests Gulbis
  Nicholas David Ionel
  Matteo Martineau
  Francesco Passaro
  Aldin Šetkić

The following players received entry from the qualifying draw:
  Federico Arnaboldi
  Íñigo Cervantes
  Giovanni Fonio
  Fábián Marozsán
  Andrew Paulson
  Filip Peliwo

The following players received entry as lucky losers:
  Georgii Kravchenko
  Shintaro Mochizuki

Champions

Singles

  Federico Coria def.  Francesco Passaro 7–6(7–2), 6–4.

Doubles

  Luciano Darderi /  Fernando Romboli def.  Diego Hidalgo /  Cristian Rodríguez 6–4, 2–6, [10–5].

References

2022 ATP Challenger Tour
2022
2022 in Italian tennis
June 2022 sports events in Italy